Orounta is a village located in the Nicosia District of Cyprus, west of Nicosia, near Peristerona.

It was the birthplace of the Saint Martyr. Saint Philoumenos (Greek: Άγιος Φιλούμενος) (15 October 1913-29 November 1979). Who was the Guardian of Jacob's Well and was killed after the assailant threw grenades into the Church of St Photini, West Bank, which is built on Jacob's Well and attacked Saint Philoumenos with an axe.

References

Communities in Nicosia District